Afumați is a commune in Dolj County, Oltenia, Romania with a population of 3,320 people. It is composed of three villages: Afumați, Boureni and Covei.

References

Communes in Dolj County
Localities in Oltenia